Julia Bianchi (born 7 October 1997) is a Brazilian professional footballer who plays as a defensive midfielder for SE Palmeiras and the Brazil women's national team.

Career

Club
Bianchi was born Xanxerê, a small town in Santa Catarina in the southern Brazil. She started her professional career at Kindermann,  a traditional women's football club based in Caçador, Santa Catarina. Then, she went to play for Centro Olímpico and then signed with Ferroviária. In 2017, Bianchi returned to Kindermann and, in the following year, she was loaned to Madrid CFF in the Primera División. Back with Kindermann, she was chosen one of the best players in the 2020 season of the Campeonato Brasileiro. As a result, in the following year, she signed with Palmeiras.

International
Bianchi was called to represent the Brazil U17 at the 2012 FIFA U-17 Women's World Cup, where she featured, as a right-back, in all the four matches Brazil played in the tournament. At the time, she was only 14 years old. Bianchi also represented Brazil U20 in two FIFA U-20 Women's World Cups, in 2014 and in 2016. On both occasions, she featured in all the matches her team played in these tournaments, playing as a defensive midfielder, as a right-back, and as a centre-back.

On 9 November, after having a great season in 2020 where Bianchi was chosen one of the best midfielders in the Campeonato Brasileiro, Bianchi was called to represent Brazil in two friendly matches against Argentina. Later, Argentina quit the matches with Ecuador taking its place. On 1 December, she debuted for Brazil coming in the half-time of the 8–0 win over Ecuador. On 28 January 2021, Bianchi was called by Pia Sundhage to represent Brazil at the 2021 SheBelieves Cup. She featured in all three matches played by her team in the tournament. Later in the same year, Bianchi was called and played in other two friendly matches for Brazil. On 11 June against Russia and on 14 June against Canada.

On 18 June 2021, Bianchi was included, by Sundhage, in the squad who represented Brazil at 2020 Summer Olympics.

References

External links
 

1997 births
Living people
Brazilian women's footballers
Women's association football midfielders
Brazil women's international footballers
Madrid CFF players
Primera División (women) players
Associação Desportiva Centro Olímpico players
Sociedade Esportiva Palmeiras (women) players
Sociedade Esportiva Kindermann players
Footballers at the 2020 Summer Olympics
Olympic footballers of Brazil